Aréthuse was a French frigate, launched in 1757 during the Seven Years' War. She was captured by the Royal Navy in 1759 and became the fifth-rate HMS Arethusa. She remained in Royal Navy service for twenty years until she was wrecked after being badly damaged in battle.

French service
The ship was constructed at Le Havre for privateer warfare as Pélerine. Soon after her launch, she was purchased by the King and commissioned as Aréthuse on 21 January 1758.
 
In April, under Captain Jean Vauquelin, she departed from Brest with the ships Echo and Bizarre (sailing En flûte) for the French Fortress of Louisbourg in Nova Scotia, then being besieged by the British.
 
Vauquelin and his ship played a significant role in defending the fortress by bombarding the positions of the besieging British troops, slowing their advance. On the foggy night of the 15 July Aréthuse departed from Louisbourg to return to France with dispatches. She was damaged by fire from British shore batteries, but was able to evade the blockading squadron of British ships. Louisbourg surrendered 11 days later.
 
She attempted to escape but after two hours, she lost her topmasts and was overtaken by her pursuers. She was fired on by Thames but only surrendered after suffering several broadsides from Venus that killed or wounded 60 crew. During the action four men on Thames were killed and 11 wounded, of whom three later died. Five men were wounded on Venus.

Royal Navy service
She entered service with the Royal Navy. For the rest of the war, she was in service in British home waters and was responsible for the capture of several French privateer cutters.
 
In 1777, a Scotsman James Aitken, widely known as John the Painter, was hanged from her mizzenmast for burning the Rope House at Portsmouth Royal Dockyard on 7 December 1776, to aid the cause of American independence
. The mast was struck from the ship and re-erected at the dockyard entrance so as many people as possible could watch the execution. This was the only execution for arson in royal dockyards.
 

On 17 June 1778, she fought a famous duel against the French 36-gun frigate, . Admiral Keppel, commanding the British fleet ordered that the French ships be pursued.
 
The captain of Belle Poule refused the order to sail back to the British fleet. The British fired a warning shot across his ship's bow, to which he responded with a full broadside. This began a furious, two-hour battle between the two ships that resulted in the deaths of the French second captain and 30 of the crew. However, Arethusa was crippled by the loss of a mast and withdrew, allowing Belle Poule to escape.
 
This battle was the first between British and French naval forces during the American Revolutionary War and took place around three weeks before the formal declaration of war by France.
 
The battle was widely celebrated in France as a victory, even inspiring a hair-style in court circles that included a model of Belle Poule.
It was also viewed as a victory in Britain and became the subject of a traditional Sea shanty, The Saucy Arethusa (Roud # 12675). Arethusa is also the subject of a song on the Decemberists' album Her Majesty the Decemberists.

 
On 18 March 1779, under captain Charles Holmes Everitt, Arethusa engaged the French Aigrette, under Lieutenant Mortemart, sustaining considerable damage in the fight. Arethusa was wrecked the next day off Ushant, at a point .
 
It was apparently the fame of this Arethusa which induced the Royal Navy, during the following two centuries, to bestow the name on a further seven consecutive individual ships (see ) and two consecutive classes of cruisers (see Arethusa-class cruiser).

See also 
 List of ships captured in the 18th century
 The Saucy Arethusa

References

Citations

Bibliography

External links
 

Age of Sail frigates of France
Maritime incidents in 1779
Shipwrecks in the Bay of Biscay
1757 ships
Frigates of the French Navy
Fifth-rate frigates of the Royal Navy
Captured ships